Hrušovany is a municipality in the Topoľčany District of the Nitra Region, Slovakia. In 2011 it had 1116 inhabitants.
The village itself possess a good infrastructure, including kindergarten, basic school, gas distribution network, outdoor and indoor sport fields. 
The most important sightseeings are Church from the 17th century and Bell Tower.

See also
 List of municipalities and towns in Slovakia

References

Genealogical resources

The records for genealogical research are available at the state archive "Statny Archiv in Nitra, Slovakia"

 Roman Catholic church records (births/marriages/deaths): 1696-1896 (parish B)

External links 
 
 
 http://en.e-obce.sk/obec/hrusovany/hrusovany.html
Surnames of living people in Hrusovany

Villages and municipalities in Topoľčany District